April Cromer is an American politician of the Republican Party. She is the member of the South Carolina House of Representatives representing District 6. Cromer won the 2022 general election for South Carolina House of Representatives District 6 after she defeated Republican incumbent W. Brian White, who had been a member of the South Carolina House since 2001, in the June primary. She won in the general election on November 8, 2022.

Elections 
Statements were issued by Henry McMaster, Governor of South Carolina who won his re-election bid, and Drew McKissick, chair of the South Carolina Republican Party.

In 2023, Cromer was one of 21 Republican co-sponsors of the South Carolina Prenatal Equal Protection Act of 2023, which would make women who had abortions eligible for the death penalty.

References 

Living people
Republican Party members of the South Carolina House of Representatives
21st-century American politicians
21st-century American women politicians
Women state legislators in South Carolina
1978 births